Carenum quadripunctatum is a species of ground beetle in the subfamily Scaritinae, found in Australia. It was described by William John Macleay in 1863.

References

quadripunctatum
Beetles described in 1863